Dozer is a stoner rock band from Sweden.

History

Early years 
Dozer was formed in the great north in 1995 by Tommi Holappa, Fredrik Nordin, Erik Bäckwall and Magnus Larsson, playing local youth centres and supporting any bands that came to their hometown. In 1996 Magnus Larsson left and Johan Rockner joined the band. In 1998 the band recorded a split EP with the American band Unida. The EP was originally released by MeteorCity and re-issued in 2005.

Breakthrough and rise to success 
While trying to secure a record deal they sent a demo tape to Man's Ruin Records, a highly influential label in the stoner rock scene at the time. Frank Kozik, the owner of Man's Ruin, was thoroughly impressed and the band quickly recorded an album. In 2000 Dozer released their first album In the Tail of a Comet, which was recorded for only $500. The band's second album Madre de Dios was released via Man's Ruin in 2001 along with a vinyl version on Molten Universe. Man's Ruin Records closed down shortly after the release. 

For their third album they worked with top Swedish producer Chips Kiesbye, known for his work with bands such as The Hellacopters. Call It Conspiracy was released in 2003 on the local Molten Universe record label and was well received by the media. At this time the band also recorded a video for the single "Rising". Soon after the release of the album Erik Bäckwall left the band and was replaced by Daniel Lidén from Demon Cleaner.

Recent times 
In 2005 Dozer recorded their fourth album Through the Eyes of Heathens at the Seawolf Studios in Helsinki. The album was released on Small Stone Records with whom they had signed on to earlier that year. The album includes the track "Until Man Exists No More" featuring guest vocals by Troy Sanders of Mastodon. Early in 2006 Lidén left the band and was replaced by Olle Mårthans.

Dozer released their fifth album, Beyond Colossal in late 2008, recorded and mixed by Daniel Lidén, and guest vocals by Neil Fallon of Clutch. The band followed it up with a short European tour.

Dozer frequently tours and has played more than 300 live shows spanning several countries. They have toured and played with bands such as Mastodon, Rollins Band, Hellacopters, Spiritual Beggars, Clutch, Unida, Zeke, Nebula, Entombed.

In November 2009 Dozer played what, according to their guitarist Tommi Holappa, could very well be their last show. They went on an indefinite hiatus due to vocalist Fredrik Nordin going back to school, with the other members continuing with different side projects.

On 21 November 2012, the band announced on its website that it was active again, having booked several shows.

Other bands 
Fredrik Nordin, Tommi Holappa, Daniel Lidén, Erik Bäckwall and Johan Rockner  were in Greenleaf.

Johan Rockner and Erik Bäckwall had another band called The Sick. They have released two albums, "...and the Hell With It!" in 2001 on Molten Universe and "Fast from the Past" in 2014.

Both Rockner and Bäckwall are members of heavy doom rock band Besvärjelsen, releasing their second album 2022 on Magnetic Eye Records.

Daniel Lidén had a newer band called Vaka, formerly called And Machine Said.. Behold:. They released one album, Kappa Delta Phi, in 2008 on Murkhouse Recordings.

Members
 Fredrik Nordin – vocals, rhythm guitar
 Tommi Holappa – lead guitar
 Johan Rockner – bass
 Olle Mårthans – drums

Previous members
 Erik Bäckwall – drums
 Daniel Lidén – drums

Discography

Studio albums
 In the Tail of a Comet (2000)
 Madre de Dios (2001)
 Call It Conspiracy (2003)
 Through the Eyes of Heathens (2006)
 Beyond Colossal (2008)
 Drifting in the Endless Void (2023)

EPs 
 Dozer "Supersoul" on Man's Ruin Records, 10" EP (May/2000). 1,500 copies pressed on green vinyl.
 Coming Down The Mountain (1999, Split EP with Unida)
 Dozer vs. Demon Cleaner (1998)
 Demon Cleaner vs. Dozer: Domestic Dudes E.P. (1999)
 Dozer vs. Demon Cleaner: Hawaiian Cottage E.P. (1999)
 Vultures (2013)

Singles
 "The Phantom" (2000)
 "Sonic Reducer" (split with Los Natas) (2002)
 "Day of the Rope" (2002)
 "Rising" (2003)
 "Star by Star" (split with Giants of Science) (2004)
 "Exoskeleton" (split with Brain Police) (2007)

Compilation appearances
 "Supersoul" Welcome to MeteorCity (MeteorCity, 1998)
 "Mammoth Mountain" A Fist Full of Freebird (Freebird Records, 1998)
 "She" on Graven Images, A Tribute to the Misfits (Freebird Records, 1999)
 "Cupola" on Molten Universe Volume one
 "Mammoth Mountain" and "Typhoon" on NERVE!
 "Man Made Mountain" on The Ultimate Fuzzcollection Volume One CD (2004 Fuzzorama Records)
 A cover of Devo's "Mongoloid" on Sucking the 70's - Back in the Saddle Again (2006 Small Stone Records)
 "Drawing Dead" on NHL 2K7 video game

Videography

"Rising" from Call It Conspiracy, edited by Johan Rockner
"From Fire Fell" from Through the Eyes of Heathens, produced and edited by Johan Rockner
"Empire's End" from Beyond Colossal, produced and edited by Johan Rockner

References

External links
 
 Last.fm page

Swedish musical groups
Swedish stoner rock musical groups
Musical groups established in 1995